Stamford American International School (SAIS) is a co-educational international school in Singapore. The school is owned and operated by Cognita and enrolled its first students in August 2009.

Stamford American offers multiple graduating pathways. Students graduate with a US accredited Stamford High School Diploma alongside the opportunity to pursue the International Baccalaureate (IB) Diploma, Advanced Placement (AP) Diploma or the Business and Technical Education Council (BTEC) Diploma. The school offers over 40 IB courses, over 20 AP courses and 3 BTEC courses.

Stamford American International School is fully accredited by the Accrediting Commission for Schools, Western Association of Schools and Colleges (WASC). It is also an authorized school for the IB Primary Years Programme (PYP), the IB Middle Years Programme (MYP) and the IB Diploma Programme (IBDP). Stamford American is an IB World School.

Stamford American has two campuses.

History
In August 2008, the Government of Singapore listed the site of the former Upper Serangoon Secondary School as available for the construction of a new international school, in part to address the need of businesses seeking to recruit employees from other countries. Potential hires were reluctant to take work where so few places existed in international schools to serve their children. In November, the Government announced that Cognita had been chosen to build a new school on the site.

The school first opened in August 2009 at the Foundation Campus, located at 11 Lorong Chuan, while the purpose designed permanent campus was being built. Stamford American International School's new $300 million campus was completed and opened in August 2012.

In August 2017, Stamford American opened the 'world's largest pre-school' in collaboration with the Australian International School (AIS). At 50,000 square meters, with five buildings and more than 100 classrooms, the Early Learning Village caters to children aged 2 months to six years.

Diversity
Stamford American's student body comprises over 75 nationalities across 6 continents. The majority of Stamford American's students come from the United States, Canada, the UK, Japan, Australia, New Zealand and China. An extensive range of cultural events such as the week-long International Fiesta organized by Stamford's Parent Teacher Association (PTA), Lunar New Year, Deepavali and Christmas are celebrated in school.

Mother Tongue Support 
Stamford offers optional after school mother tongue programs for all children. Led by the parents and the larger international community, Stamford offers 12 different mother tongue programs weekly. The 12 languages are: Danish, Dutch, Filipino, Finnish, French, Hebrew, Hindi, Norwegian, Portuguese, Russian, Spanish, Swedish. Children in the program have access to native teachers, classroom facilities, IT support, library and event spaces.

Academic 
Stamford American is the first and only school in Singapore to offer multiple graduating pathways. Students graduate with a US accredited Stamford High School Diploma alongside the opportunity to pursue the International Baccalaureate (IB) Diploma or Advanced Placement (AP) Diploma. The school offers over 40 IB courses and more than 20 AP courses. In December 2020, Stamford American also became the first International School in Southeast Asia to offer Level 3 BTEC Diplomas awarded by Pearson, equivalent to the A Levels.

The typical student-teacher ratio is 5-11: 1 (Nursery to KG2), 12-24: 1(G1 - G5) and 24:1 (G6 - G11).

World Language Program 
The Stamford World Language Program offers 3 of the world's most spoken languages - Mandarin, Spanish, and English. The program offers Bilingual Mandarin and English from 3 to 10 years, Daily Mandarin or Spanish for 18 months to 11 years and the English as an Additional Language Program for 5 to 16 years.

Bilingual Mandarin and English This program gives learners equal exposure to English and Mandarin in the subjects and concepts taught within their grade. Classes are taught by bilingual teachers who can fully engage with students as they master both languages.
Daily Mandarin or Spanish Every child in the Early Learning Village and Elementary School receives daily Mandarin or Spanish lessons as part of the curriculum. In Secondary School, these classes become more intensive 80-minute sessions every other day. Progress is measured through 9 levels for Spanish and 7 levels for Mandarin. Students are given the scope to learn at their own pace and are assessed on Standards-Based Measurement of Proficiency (STAMP).
English as an Additional Language (EAL) Available to students who want to gain more confidence in their English language ability, Stamford American offers 2 programs for different levels of proficiency:
Mainstream EAL for mid- to high-level English language learners, available from Kindergarten 2 to Grade 10.
Sheltered EAL for students who need more specialized support, available from Kindergarten 2 to Grade 8.

Visual Arts 
Every year, students get to showcase their creativity on campus through exhibitions of their artwork. Aspiring young artists get the chance to exhibit at the annual International Schools Art Exhibition and the annual SEASAC Arts Festival.

Kindergarten 1 to Grade 5 Visual arts lessons in the Primary Years Program (PYP) are designed to foster creativity and self-discovery. Students are exposed to visual concepts through a hands-on approach to art and are prompted to respond to various aesthetics.
Grade 6 to Grade 10 The Middle Years Program (MYP) visual arts course prepares students for the International Baccalaureate Diploma Program (IB DP). Students are introduced to the elements and principles of art, and are taught techniques in ceramics, textiles, printmaking, illustration, painting and other art specializations.
Grade 11 to Grade 12 The visual arts course at the DP level challenges learners to examine their own creative and cultural expectations and boundaries. The thought-provoking program hones students’ art techniques while developing their critical perspectives in approaching and appreciating art.

College Counselling 
Stamford American is one of the few schools in Singapore with onsite SAT and ACT test centers. Stamford American also has a dedicated Academic and College Counseling Team that designs personalized support programs for each student, and monitors progress and achievements. The team also invites and hosts experts who can advise on the various aspects of preparing for higher education.

Academic Field Studies Program 
The Academic Field Studies Program starts from Grade 3 at Stamford American, and explores the academic curriculum within environments beyond the classroom. Developed in consultation with experiential education market-leaders JUMP! Foundation, students take on leadership roles as they prepare for the experiences in the field, build connections with their peers and teachers as they encounter challenges in real-world environments, linked to their academics.

Academic Performance 
Class of 2021 graduates completed the IB course with a 100% pass rate. The Class of 2021 has been accepted into competitive universities around the world in 18 countries, with notable acceptances from Boston University, New York University, University of California Los Angeles, University of California Berkeley, Imperial College, University of Amsterdam, National University of Singapore, Nanyang Technological University amongst others. The university destinations include the US, UK, Canada, Netherlands, Australia, Singapore, Switzerland, Spain, India, Japan, Philippines, Finland, France, Sweden, amongst others.

The average AP score for 2021 was a 3.3, with over 70% of the exam scores being a 3 or above. In 90% of the AP subjects, over half the candidates scored a 3 or above.

Two students earned a Distinction and a Merit respectively for the BTEC Subsidiary Diploma in Performing Arts: Acting.

Co-Curricular and Extra-Curricular Activities
Stamford American's Co-Curricular Activities (CCA) Program encompasses over 350 activity choices throughout the year for students from Pre-K to Grade 12 with over 75% of Stamford American students enrolled (3389 CCA places). The school has an online CCA registration program, includes an online CCA brochure which has information on transportation, attendance, class teacher admin and payment module. This allows families to sit with their children and easily tailor the extracurricular programming for individual and family interests. The program incorporates activities from financial market trading to Calligraphy; Model United Nations to Aerospace.

Performing Arts 
Stamford American provides numerous opportunities for students to pursue their dramatic interests. 10 full-scale productions are put up every year at the state-of-the-art Reagan Theater, the only school theater in Singapore that features an LED backdrop screen. Weekly drama classes begin in Kindergarten and continue to Grade 10. Stamford American also offers an International Baccalaureate (IB) Diploma in Theater and a BTEC in Performing Arts (Acting) that prepares interested students for a career in the dramatic arts.

Music 
Students at the Early Learning Village (ELV) are introduced to music and movement at the tender age of 18 months. Stamford American is the first and only school to offer the Suzuki Violin Program for students from 3 years old. The Suzuki method promotes creative development through positive motivation and learning with others. From the age of 5, children can move on to cello lessons.

Music is a part of the curriculum for students up to Grade 8, while students in Grade 9 and Grade 10 can choose music for their Middle Years Program (MYP) arts allocation. In Grade 11 and Grade 12, students who are keen on continuing their music education can opt for it as their arts subject within the Diploma Program (DP). More than 400 students are enrolled in the Instrumental Music Program, which supports instruction in 12 instruments by highly trained and passionate music teachers.

Athletics 
Stamford American's Athletic Program commits to sport for all while developing student athletes to reach their full potential. The school aims to offer appropriate pathways for sporting development from Kindergarten to Grade 12 in a wide range of individual and team sports. Team sports offered include badminton, basketball, cross country, golf,  gymnastics, rugby, soccer, softball, swimming, tennis, touch rugby, track & field and volleyball. Stamford American is a member school of the South East Asia Student Activities Conference (SEASAC), an elite Sports and Co-Curricular Activities league with member schools in the region. SEASAC activities include arts, badminton, basketball, cross-country, golf, gymnastics, Model United Nations (MUN), soccer, swimming, rugby, touch rugby, softball, tennis and volleyball.

Community service 
All students at Stamford American are exposed to community service at levels of involvement appropriate to their age. The school encourages students to get involved in charitable activities by reflecting on those around them, then planning and driving meaningful initiatives to help those who are in need.

The Stamford American community in partnership with World Assistance for Cambodia built the Cambodia Hope School in the Boribo Province of Cambodia. The school was set up to give disadvantaged children in Kampong Chhnang a chance at education and a brighter future. In 2016, students and teachers from Stamford American visited the school armed with lesson plans and school supplies. Students at Hope School received stationery and sports equipment, while English as a Second Language (ESL) resources were distributed to local teachers to guide them in integrating English into lessons.

In 2017, together with the Parent Teacher Association (PTA), Stamford American students helped to make some dreams come true through the Christmas Giving Tree. They fulfilled the wishes of families and children from these charities: Singapore Cancer Society, SOSD, Make a Wish Foundation, Waterways, Willing Hearts, Ronald McDonald House and Autism Resource Center (ARC).

Facilities 
Stamford American has two centrally-located campuses that are linked by a shuttle bus service, making their facilities accessible to both parents and students.

Elementary & Secondary Campus 

3 swimming pools
2 air-conditioned indoor sports arenas
2 libraries
Rooftop tennis courts
Dance studios 
Rock–climbing walls
Multipurpose sports field 
Indoor virtual golf studio
500-seat theater
Innovation Center and Maker Space with 3D printers, robots and other advanced electronics

Early Learning Village 

6 ultraviolet-protected outdoor areas 
Infant Care Pod with sensory play areas
20-meter pool with adjustable lanes and resting benches for safe water activities
The Hive—an air-conditioned multipurpose gymnasium for sports and performances

References

External links
Official website

American international schools in Singapore
Educational institutions established in 2009
Cognita
2009 establishments in Singapore